Kamenicë Church is a ruined church in Palavli, Delvinë, Albania. It is a Cultural Monument of Albania.

References

Cultural Monuments of Albania
Buildings and structures in Delvinë
Church ruins in Albania
Churches in Vlorë County